The Serbia men's national under-20 ice hockey team is the national under-20 ice hockey team in Serbia. The team represents Serbia at the International Ice Hockey Federation's World Junior Hockey Championship Division II Group B.

Junior
Junior national ice hockey teams